Crematogaster is an ecologically diverse genus of ants found worldwide, which are characterised by a distinctive heart-shaped gaster (abdomen), which gives them one of their common names, the Saint Valentine ant. Members of this genus are also known as cocktail ants because of their habit of raising their abdomens when alarmed. Most species are arboreal (tree-dwelling). These ants are sometimes known as acrobat ants.

Acrobat ants acquire food largely through predation on other insects, such as wasps. They use venom to stun their prey and a complex trail-laying process to lead comrades to food sources. Like most ants, Crematogaster species reproduce by partaking in nuptial flights, where the queen acquires the sperm used to fertilize every egg throughout her life.

Predatory behavior
Acrobat ants hunt both large and small prey. When  time to hunt, foragers typically recruit nearby ants to assist them. The ants can mark and detect their prey by specific contact.  When they make contact, they immediately attack, sometimes releasing a small amount of venom with a sting. They also release an alarm pheromone to alert still more workers that prey has been seized. If other workers are present, the ants  "spread-eagle" the prey. When the prey is spread-eagled, all limbs are outstretched and it is carried along the backsides of the ants. The ants carry arolia, pad-like projections that are used to carry the prey back to the nest. These arolia are critical because acrobat ants are arboreal and often need to travel up trees to return to their nesting location. If the prey is small and  only one ant is present, it can carry the prey individually. If other workers are present, the ant recruits carrying assistance, even if the prey is small. Acrobat ants typically eat grasshoppers, termites, wasps, and other small insects.

Predation of wasps
Acrobat ants are known to eat different types of wasps. Many of these wasps have mutualistic relationships with trees involving pollination. Additionally, the wasps typically have cycles that they follow, which can make locating and capturing them by the ants more difficult. As a result, acrobat ants have evolved unique characteristics to detect the presence of prey. They have become sensitive to chemical signals released by wasps, and use these signals as cues in locating their prey.

Habitat

Acrobat ants can be found either outdoors or indoors with great frequency in each case. Outdoors, they are usually arboreal, but they often live in many common areas in the wild. These areas are typically moist and are often dark. They can often be found in trees, collections of wood (like firewood), and under rocks. Indoors, nests have been found inside homes around electrical wires. These locations are often very near large food supplies and may be around other ant nests.

Reproduction
As with many social ant species, in acrobat ants, a queen mates with a single male during a nuptial flight. During this flight, the winged queen and winged male mate, and the male dies shortly afterwards. The female eventually lands and removes her own wings, which she no longer needs.

In these ant species, a variation also exists to this mating strategy. Large female workers exist that are smaller than winged queens, yet larger than small workers. They also have many anatomical features that are intermediate to small workers and the queen, including ovary size and composition, and patches. These females can produce unfertilized eggs that can eventually develop into males in colonies that do not have a queen. If these eggs are produced in a colony with a queen, the queen can devour them. Larvae can also devour the eggs. Large workers normally produce more eggs in ant colonies that are queenless. Large workers can be tended to by small workers in a similar manner to ant queens.

"Large workers" have sizable implications for acrobat colonies. Given that large workers create eggs that can develop into functioning ants, they can actually create new colonies. They can also shift or shape the population dynamics of an ant colony that already exists. Also, for the large workers who produce these eggs, if they are eaten, this denotes a waste of energy on failed reproduction. Not all eusocial ant species have large workers, so acrobat ants are unique in this respect.

Defensive behavior
Crematogaster ants "are able to raise their abdomens forward and over their thoraces and heads, which allow them to point their abdominal tips in nearly all directions." When in conflict, acrobat ants can release a venom by flexing their abdominal regions. The effectiveness of the venom varies greatly with the opposer to the ant. For example, some other ant species are not very resistant and can be killed with only a few drops, while other ant species and insects have a high degree of resistance to even large amounts of venom. However, the venom can often repel offending ants if it comes into contact with their antennae. Acrobat ants are typically not repelled by venom from other acrobat ants. The venom is created in a metapleural gland and usually consists of complex and simple phenols and carboxylic acids, some of which have known antibiotic properties. The ants apply froths to conflicting organisms. The froths are applied in a "paintbrush" style manner to surround the offender. "Frothing" has evolved independently in ants and grasshoppers.

Division of labor
As with most eusocial insects, acrobat ants tend to form castes based on labor duties. This division is normally behavioral, but also has a physical basis, including size or age. Soldiers are typically larger with a more developed metapleural gland specialized for colony defence or food acquisition. A worker ant is generally smaller than soldiers and queens, and its main task is to assist the queen in rearing the young. Workers vary in size more than soldiers. This considerable variation in size may have played a considerable role in the evolution of "large workers" in this genus.

Mutualism
Acrobat ants participate in a form of mutualism called myrmecophytism, in which plants provide shelter and secreted food, while the ants provide the plants with protection from predators. Many acrobat ants use plants such as Macaranga as their main source of food.

The ants become alarmed when the plant is disturbed. They quickly emerge from their plant shelter and become aggressive. This can be the case even when neighboring plants are under attack. They can also recruit other ants to help in their defense.

Trail-laying
Acrobat ants lay scent trails for many different reasons - communication, recruitment of workers, etc. The scents originate in the tibial gland and are secreted from the gaster of the ants. The gaster never actually touches the surface of what the ant is leaving the scent on. When laying a scent trail, the ants will typically lift their abdomen sharply upward then bend it forward.

One practical use for trail laying is to mark the path toward food. The ants often find a food source requiring them to make multiple trips to the nest or shelter. To keep track of space, a scent is useful. Another significant use of a scent is to recruit other workers. This is actually helpful in a number of scenarios. It can increase efficiency when a food source is located and needs to be brought back to the nest. It can also be helpful in recruiting assistance during an attack on one of the acrobat ants' plant shelters.

See also
Euryplatea nanaknihali

Species
More than 430 species are recognised in the genus Crematogaster :

C. abdominalis Motschoulsky, 1863 
C. aberrans Forel, 1892 
C. abrupta Mann, 1919 
C. abstinens Forel, 1899 
C. acaciae Forel, 1892 
C. aculeata Donisthorpe, 1941 
C. acuta Fabricius, 1804 
C. adrepens Forel, 1897 
C. aegyptiaca Mayr, 1862 
C. affabilis Forel, 1907 
C. afghanica Forel, 1967 
C. africana Mayr, 1895 
C. agnetis Forel, 1892 
C. agniae Karavaiev, 1935 
C. agnita Wheeler, 1934 
C. aitkenii Forel, 1902 
C. algirica Lucas, 1849 
C. alluaudi Emery, 1893 
C. aloysiisabaudiae Menozzi, 1930 
C. alulai Emery, 1901 
C. amabilis Santschi, 1911 
C. amapaensis Kempf, 1960 
C. ambigua Santschi, 1926 
C. amita Forel, 1913 
C. ampla Powell, 2014 
C. ampullaris Smith, 1861 
C. ancipitula Forel, 1917 
C. angulosa Andre, 1896 
C. angusticeps Santschi, 1911 
C. antaris Forel, 1894 
C. anthracina Smith, 1857 
C. apicalis Motschoulsky, 1878 
C. arata Emery, 1906 
C. arcuata Forel, 1899 
C. arizonensis Wheeler, 1908 
C. armandi Forel, 1921 
C. arnoldi Forel, 1914 
C. aroensis Menozzi, 1935 
C. arthurimuelleri Forel, 1894 
C. ashmeadi Mayr, 1886 
C. atitlanica Wheeler, 1936 
C. atkinsoni Wheeler, 1919 
C. atra Mayr, 1870 
C. auberti Emery, 1869 
C. augusti Emery, 1895 
C. aurita Karavaiev, 1935 
C. australis Mayr, 1876 
C. baduvi Forel, 1912 
C. bakeri Menozzi, 1925 
C. barbouri Weber, 1934 
C. batesi Forel, 1911 
C. bequaerti Forel, 1913 
C. betapicalis Smith, 1995 
C. bicolor Smith, 1860 
C. biformis Andre, 1892 
C. binghamii Forel, 1904 
C. bingo Forel, 1908 
C. biroi Mayr, 1897 
C. bison Forel, 1913 
C. boera Ruzsky, 1926 
C. bogojawlenskii Ruzsky, 1905 
C. boliviana Wheeler, 1922 
C. borneensis Andre, 1896 
C. brasiliensis Mayr, 1878 
C. brevimandibularis Donisthorpe, 1943 
C. brevis Emery, 1887 
C. brevispinosa Mayr, 1870 
C. breviventris Santschi, 1920 
C. browni Buren, 1968 
C. bruchi Forel, 1912 
C. brunnea Smith, 1857 
C. brunneipennis Andre, 1890 
C. brunnescens Motschoulsky, 1863 
C. buchneri Forel, 1894 
C. buddhae Forel, 1902 
C. butteli Forel, 1913 
C. californica Wheeler, 1919 
C. capensis Mayr, 1862 
C. captiosa Forel, 1911 
C. carinata Mayr, 1862 
C. castanea Smith, 1858 
C. censor Forel, 1910 
C. cephalotes Smith, 1857 
C. cerasi Fitch, 1855 
C. chiarinii Emery, 1881 
C. chlorotica Emery, 1899 
C. chopardi Bernard, 1950 
C. chungi Brown, 1949 
C. cicatriculosa Roger, 1863 
C. clariventris Mayr, 1895 
C. clydia Forel, 1912 
C. coarctata Mayr, 1870 
C. coelestis Santschi, 1911 
C. colei Buren, 1968 
C. concava Emery, 1899 
C. constructor Emery, 1895 
C. coriaria Mayr, 1872 
C. cornigera Forel, 1902 
C. cornuta Crawley, 1924 
C. corporaali Santschi, 1928 
C. corticicola Mayr, 1887 
C. corvina Mayr, 1870 
C. crassicornis Emery, 1893 
C. crinosa Mayr, 1862 
C. cristata Santschi, 1929 
C. curvispinosa Mayr, 1862 
C. cuvierae Donisthorpe, 1945 
C. cylindriceps Wheeler, 1927 
C. dahlii Forel, 1901 
C. daisyi Forel, 1901 
C. dalyi Forel, 1902 
C. decamera Forel, 1910 
C. degeeri Forel, 1886 
C. delagoensis Forel, 1894 
C. delitescens Wheeler, 1921 
C. dentinodis Forel, 1901 
C. depilis Wheeler, 1919 
C. depressa (Latreille, 1802) 
C. descarpentriesi Santschi, 1928 
C. descolei Kusnezov, 1949 
C. desecta Forel, 1911 
C. desperans Forel, 1914 
C. detecta sp. nov. 
C. difformis Smith, 1857 
C. diffusa (Jerdon, 1851) 
C. dispar Forel, 1902 
C. distans Mayr, 1870 
C. dohrni Mayr, 1879 
C. dolens Forel, 1910 
C. donisthorpei Santschi, 1934 
C. dorsidens Santschi, 1925 
C. dubia Karavaiev, 1935 
C. ebenina Forel, 1902 
C. edentula Santschi, 1914 
C. egidyi Forel, 1903 
C. egregior Forel, 1912 
C. elegans Smith, 1859 
C. elysii Mann, 1919 
C. emeryana Creighton, 1950 
C. emeryi Forel, 1907 
C. emmae Forel, 1891 
C. enneamera Emery, 1900 
C. ensifera Forel, 1910 
C. erecta Mayr, 1866 
C. esterelana (Bernard, 1978) 
C. eurydice Forel, 1915 
C. euterpe Santschi, 1922 
C. evallans Forel, 1907 
C. excisa Mayr, 1895 
C. ferrarii Emery, 1888 
C. flavicornis Emery, 1897 
C. flavitarsis Emery, 1900 
C. foraminiceps Santschi, 1913 
C. formosa Mayr, 1870 
C. foxi Mann, 1919 
C. fraxatrix Forel, 1911 
C. fritzi Emery, 1901 
C. frivola Forel, 1902 
C. fruhstorferi Emery, 1901 
C. fuentei Menozzi, 1922 
C. fulmeki Forel, 1922 
C. fusca Mayr, 1876 
C. gabonensis Emery, 1899 
C. gallicola Forel, 1894 
C. gambiensis Andre, 1889 
C. gavapiga Menozzi, 1935 
C. gerstaeckeri Dalla Torre, 1892 
C. gibba Emery, 1894 
C. gordani Karaman, M., 2008
C. gratiosa Santschi, 1926 
C. grevei Forel, 1891 
C. gutenbergi Santschi, 1914 
C. heathi Mann, 1916 
C. hemiceros Santschi, 1926 
C. hespera Buren, 1968 
C. hezaradjatica Pisarski, 1967 
C. himalayana Forel, 1902 
C. hogsoni Forel, 1902 
C. homeri Forel, 1913 
C. hottentota Emery, 1899 
C. hova Forel, 1887 
C. huberi Forel, 1907 
C. iheringi Forel, 1908 
C. ilgii Forel, 1910 
C. impressa Emery, 1899 
C. impressiceps Mayr, 1902 
C. inca Wheeler, 1925 
C. inconspicua Mayr, 1896 
C. incorrecta Santschi, 1917 
C. indefensa Kempf, 1968 
C. inermis Mayr, 1862 
C. inflata Smith, 1857 
C. innocens Forel, 1911 
C. inops Forel, 1892 
C. insularis Smith, 1859 
C. ionia Forel, 1911 
C. iridipennis Smith, 1865 
C. irritabilis Smith, 1860 
C. isolata Buren, 1968 
C. jacobsoni Forel, 1911 
C. javanica Menozzi, 1935 
C. jeanneli Santschi, 1914 
C. jehovae Forel, 1907 
C. jullieni Santschi, 1910 
C. juventa Santschi, 1926 
C. kachelibae Arnold, 1954 
C. karawaiewi Menozzi, 1935 
C. kasaiensis Forel, 1913 
C. kelleri Forel, 1891 
C. kirbii (Sykes, 1835) 
C. kneri Mayr, 1862 
C. kohli Forel, 1909 
C. kutteri Viehmeyer, 1924 
C. laboriosa Smith, 1874 
C. laestrygon Emery, 1869 
C. laeviceps Smith, 1858 
C. laevis Mayr, 1878 
C. laevissima Smith, 1860 
C. laeviuscula Mayr, 1870 
C. lamottei Bernard, 1953 
C. lango Weber, 1943 
C. larreae Buren, 1968 
C. latuka Weber, 1943 
C. laurenti Forel, 1909 
C. ledouxi Soulie, 1961 
C. libengensis Stitz, 1916 
C. liengmei Forel, 1894 
C. limata Smith, 1858 
C. lineolata (Say, 1836) 
C. litoralis Arnold, 1955 
C. lobata Emery, 1895 
C. longiceps Forel, 1910 
C. longiclava Emery, 1893 
C. longipilosa Forel, 1907 
C. longispina Emery, 1890 
C. lorteti Forel, 1910 
C. lotti Weber, 1943 
C. lucayana Wheeler, 1905 
C. luctans Forel, 1907 
C. lutzi Forel, 1905 
C. macracantha Creighton, 1945 
C. madagascariensis Andre, 1887 
C. madecassa Emery, 1895 
C. magitae Forel, 1910 
C. magnifica Santschi, 1925 
C. major Donisthorpe, 1941 
C. manni Buren, 1968 
C. margaritae Emery, 1895 
C. marioni Buren, 1968 
C. marthae Forel, 1892 
C. matsumurai Forel, 1901 
C. meijerei Emery, 1911 
C. melanogaster Emery, 1895 
C. menilekii Forel, 1894 
C. mesonotalis Emery, 1911 
C. microspina Menozzi, 1942 
C. millardi Forel, 1902 
C. mimicans Donisthorpe, 1932 
C. mimosae Santschi, 1914 
C. minutissima Mayr, 1870 
C. misella Arnold, 1920 
C. mjobergi Forel, 1915 
C. modiglianii Emery, 1900 
C. montenigrinus Karaman, M., 2008
C. montezumia Smith, 1858 
C. monticola Arnold, 1920 
C. moorei Donisthorpe, 1941 
C. moqorensis Pisarski, 1967 
C. mormonum Wheeler, 1919 
C. mottazi Santschi, 1928 
C. mucronata Emery, 1900 
C. muralti Forel, 1910 
C. mutans Buren, 1968 
C. myops Forel, 1911 
C. natalensis Forel, 1910 
C. navajoa Buren, 1968 
C. nesiotis Mann, 1919 
C. neuvillei Forel, 1907 
C. nigeriensis Santschi, 1914 
C. nigrans Forel, 1915 
C. nigriceps Emery, 1897 
C. nigronitens Santschi, 1917 
C. nigropilosa Mayr, 1870 
C. nocturna Buren, 1968 
C. oasium Santschi, 1911 
C. obnigra Mann, 1919 
C. obscura Smith, 1857 
C. obscurior Dalla Torre, 1892 
C. ochracea Mayr, 1862 
C. ochraceiventris Stitz, 1916 
C. onusta Stitz, 1925 
C. opaca Mayr, 1870 
C. opaciceps Mayr, 1901 
C. opuntiae Buren, 1968 
C. ornatipilis Wheeler, 1918 
C. orobia Santschi, 1919 
C. osakensis Forel, 1900 
C. oscaris Forel, 1910 
C. overbecki Viehmeyer, 1916 
C. oxygynoides Santschi, 1934 
C. painei Donisthorpe, 1945 
C. pallida Lowne, 1865 
C. pallipes Mayr, 1862 
C. paolii Menozzi, 1930 
C. paradoxa Emery, 1894 
C. parallela Santschi, 1925 
C. parapilosa sp. nov. 
C. patei Buren, 1968 
C. pauciseta Emery, 1899 
C. pauli Emery, 1901 
C. pellens Walker, 1859 
C. perelegans Forel, 1902 
C. peringueyi Emery, 1895 
C. peristerica Menozzi, 1925 
C. perthensis Crawley, 1922 
C. peruviana (Wheeler, 1922) 
C. petiolidens Forel, 1916 
C. phoenica Santschi, 1915 
C. phoenix Santschi, 1921 
C. pia Forel, 1911 
C. pilosa Emery, 1895 
C. pinicola Deyrup, 2007
C. polita Smith, 1865 
C. politula Forel, 1902 
C. polymnia Santschi, 1922 
C. popohana Forel, 1912 
C. praecursor Emery, 1891 
C. pseudinermis Viehmeyer, 1923 
C. pulchella Bernard, 1953 
C. punctulata Emery, 1895 
C. pusilla (Heer, 1850) 
C. pygmaea Forel, 1904 
C. pythia Forel, 1915 
C. quadriformis Roger, 1863 
C. quadrispinosa Roger, 1863 
C. queenslandica Forel, 1902 
C. ralumensis Forel, 1901 
C. ranavalonae Forel, 1887 
C. ransonneti Mayr, 1868 
C. rasoherinae Forel, 1891 
C. rectinota Forel, 1913 
C. recurva Emery, 1897 
C. resulcata Bolton, 1995 
C. retifera Santschi, 1926 
C. rifelna Buren, 1968 
C. rivai Emery, 1897 
C. rogenhoferi Mayr, 1879 
C. rogeri Emery, 1922 
C. rossi Buren, 1968 
C. rothneyi Mayr, 1879 
C. rudis Emery, 1894 
C. rufa (Jerdon, 1851) 
C. rufigena Arnold, 1958 
C. rufotestacea Mayr, 1876 
C. rugosa Andre, 1895 
C. rugosior Santschi, 1910 
C. ruspolii Forel, 1892 
C. russoi Menozzi, 1930 
C. rustica Santschi, 1935 
C. sagei Forel, 1902 
C. sanguinea Roger, 1863 
C. santschii Forel, 1913 
C. saussurei Forel, 1899 
C. scapamaris Santschi, 1922 
C. scelerata Santschi, 1917 
C. schencki Forel, 1891 
C. schimmeri Forel, 1912 
C. schmidti (Mayr, 1853) 
C. schultzei Forel, 1910 
C. scita Forel, 1902 
C. sculpturata Pergande, 1896 
C. scutellaris (Olivier, 1792) 
C. semperi Emery, 1893 
C. senegalensis Roger, 1863 
C. sewellii Forel, 1891 
C. similis Stitz, 1911 
C. simoni Emery, 1893 
C. sjostedti (Mayr, 1907) 
C. skounensis Soulie, 1961 
C. solenopsides Emery, 1899 
C. solers Forel, 1910 
C. sordidula (Nylander, 1849) 
C. sorokini Ruzsky, 1905 
C. soror Forel, 1902 
C. spengeli Forel, 1912 
C. stadelmanni Mayr, 1895 
C. steinheili Forel, 1881 
C. stenocephala Emery, 1922 
C. stethogompha Wheeler, 1919 
C. stigmata Santschi, 1914 
C. stollii Forel, 1885 
C. striatula Emery, 1892 
C. subcircularis Mayr, 1879 
C. subdentata Mayr, 1877 
C. subnuda Mayr, 1879 
C. sumichrasti Mayr, 1870 
C. tanakai Hosoishi, S. & Ogata, K., 2009
C. tarsata Smith, 1865 
C. terminalis (Shuckard, 1838) 
C. tetracantha Emery, 1887 
C. theta Forel, 1911 
C. togoensis Donisthorpe, 1945 
C. torosa Mayr, 1870 
C. transiens Forel, 1913 
C. transvaalensis Forel, 1894 
C. trautweini Viehmeyer, 1914 
C. travancorensis Forel, 1902 
C. treubi Emery, 1896 
C. tumidula Emery, 1900 
C. udo Forel, 1905 
C. unciata Santschi, 1925 
C. ustiventris Menozzi, 1935 
C. vandeli Soulie, 1961 
C. vandermeermohri Menozzi, 1930 
C. vermiculata Emery, 1895 
C. vetusta sp. nov. 
C. victima Smith, 1858 
C. vidua Santschi, 1928 
C. vitalisi Menozzi, 1925 
C. voeltzkowi Forel, 1907 
C. vulcania Santschi, 1913 
C. walshi Forel, 1902 
C. warburgi Menozzi, 1933 
C. wasmanni Santschi, 1910 
C. weberi Emery, 1911 
C. wellmani Forel, 1909 
C. werneri Mayr, 1907 
C. wheeleri Mann, 1919 
C. whitei Wheeler, 1915 
C. wilwerthi Santschi, 1910 
C. wroughtonii Forel, 1902 
C. xerophila Wheeler, 1915 
C. yappi Forel, 1901 
C. yamanei Hosoishi, S. & Ogata, K., 2009
C. zavattarii Menozzi, 1926 
C. zonacaciae Weber, 1943

References

External links

Black Ants' unique nest in a tree trunk- Philippines by Isidro A. T. Savillo

 
Myrmicinae
Ant genera
Taxonomy articles created by Polbot